Robert "Bob" G. Lawson is a professor at the University of Kentucky College of Law, Kentucky, United States.

Lawson holds the position of the principal drafter to both the Kentucky Penal Code and the Kentucky Rules of Evidence. He has also served as Dean of the College of Law from 1971 to 1973 and 1982 to 1988, and is a member of the University of Kentucky College of Law Hall of Fame, having been inducted in 1996.  He is also a member of the University of Kentucky Hall of Distinguished Alumni.

Professor Lawson's hero is "The Great Wigmore".

Lawson taught his final class on December 4, 2014.

References

1938 births
Living people
Berea College alumni
People from Kentucky
University of Kentucky College of Law alumni
University of Kentucky faculty
American legal scholars